Ookini Arena Maishima is an indoor sporting arena located in Osaka, Japan. The capacity of the arena is 7,000 people.

Since 2004, it has been the home arena and the practice facilities for the Osaka Evessa, a professional basketball team of the B.League.

External links
  Ookini Arena Maishima web site

Osaka Evessa
Sports venues in Osaka
Indoor arenas in Japan
Basketball venues in Japan